"Go Go Go" is a song performed by American post-hardcore band Sleeping With Sirens released for digital download on January 22, 2015. It serves as the second single off of the group's fourth studio album, Madness, which was released on March 13, 2015 via Epitaph Records and follows up the album's lead single, "Kick Me." The music video for "Go Go Go" was self-directed by Sleeping With Sirens and shot by Sean Garcia of Flippen Music, which premiered on the single's release day.

Background

"Go Go Go" was recorded in the summer of 2014 and was produced by John Feldmann and Sleeping With Sirens. The band first performed the song the day following its release, on Friday, January 23, 2015, at the Viejas Arena in San Diego, California on The World Tour with co-headliners Pierce the Veil. The song was released on January 22, 2015, as part of a pre-order campaign for its parent album, Madness.

According to Jon Caramanica and Nate Chinen of the New York Times, the lyrical themes of "Go Go Go" are about a reckless relationship. Musically, they described it as "...burst[ing] with zooming guitars and vocals processed until they gleam."

Track listing

Release history

References

2015 singles
Epitaph Records singles
2014 songs
Sleeping with Sirens songs
Songs written by John Feldmann
Songs written by Simon Wilcox
Song recordings produced by John Feldmann